Jeffrey A. Neubauer (born December 8, 1955) is an American businessman and politician who served as a member of the Wisconsin State Assembly, and was Chairman of the Democratic Party of Wisconsin from 1989 to 1993.

Early life and education
Neubauer was born on December 8, 1955 in Racine, Wisconsin. He graduated from Jerome I. Case High School in Mount Pleasant, Wisconsin and Stanford University, where he earned a B.A. and did graduate work.

Career
Neubauer started his political career as an aide to Congressman Les Aspin (WI-01). He was elected to the Assembly in 1980, where he served for four terms, leaving in 1989. After leaving office he was elected chairman of the Wisconsin Democratic Party for four years. Neubauer also served as Bill Clinton's campaign manager for Wisconsin in both 1992 and 1996; Clinton carried the state both times.

In 1993, when Aspin was named Clinton's Secretary of Defense, Neubauer ran for congress in the special election, but lost the primary to Peter W. Barca.

Personal life
Neubauer is married to Lisa S. Neubauer, Chief Judge of the Wisconsin Court of Appeals and 2019 candidate for Wisconsin Supreme Court. Together they have three children, including Greta Neubauer, a current member of the Wisconsin State Assembly. Neubauer resides in Racine, Wisconsin.

Electoral history

Wisconsin Assembly 62nd District (1980)

| colspan="6" style="text-align:center;background-color: #e9e9e9;"| Primary Election

| colspan="6" style="text-align:center;background-color: #e9e9e9;"| General Election

Wisconsin Assembly 19th District (1982)

| colspan="6" style="text-align:center;background-color: #e9e9e9;"| Primary Election

| colspan="6" style="text-align:center;background-color: #e9e9e9;"| General Election

Wisconsin Assembly 62nd District (1984, 1986)

| colspan="6" style="text-align:center;background-color: #e9e9e9;"| Primary Election

| colspan="6" style="text-align:center;background-color: #e9e9e9;"| General Election

| colspan="6" style="text-align:center;background-color: #e9e9e9;"| Primary Election

| colspan="6" style="text-align:center;background-color: #e9e9e9;"| General Election

U.S. House of Representatives (1993)

| colspan="6" style="text-align:center;background-color: #e9e9e9;"| Democratic Primary Election, April 6, 1993

References

Politicians from Racine, Wisconsin
Democratic Party members of the Wisconsin State Assembly
Stanford University alumni
1955 births
Living people